Schongau is a town in Bavaria, near the Alps. It is located along the Lech, between Landsberg am Lech and Füssen. It has about 12,000 inhabitants. Schongau has a well-preserved old wall around the center.

Local history 
The origin of Schongau is the current Altenstadt (lit.: old town). A large number of the inhabitants moved only a few kilometres into a new settlement founded on the Lech and took the name Schongau with them in the 13th century. The hillside was far better situated to defend it. The town of Schongau is located very close to the former Roman road to Augsburg, Via Claudia Augusta (47 AD) and has its name from the Romans. In the Middle Ages, it was an important hub and an commercial centre on route Verona-Augsburg-Nuremberg and at salt road from Berchtesgadener Land into the Allgäu.
Lechrain, populated by the Alemanni, was under the rule of the Swabian Welfs until the 12 century. After the death of Welf VI in 1191, the Welf territories in Swabia changed in to the hands to the Hohenstaufen. Emperor Frederick Barbarossa gave it to the Hohenstaufen. When the last Staufer ruler Conradin had moved to Italy in 1267 to defend his power against Charles of Anjou, his ally Duke Ludwig II of Bavaria unexpectedly denied his help and demanded the payment of debts, which is why Konradin had to give away a large part of his possessions as the Duke of Swabia (called the Konradinian donation). In this way, the Bavarian dukes of Wittelsbach, who were ambitious to extend their influence into the Alamannian settlements up to Lech and came to rule the Lechrain in 1268.
Emperor Ludwig the Bavarian had given Schongau the right to mint in 1331. Duke Christoph der Starke liked to stay in the city. Christophstrasse is named after him in the historic centre of the town. On 22 May 1493, a devastating fire destroyed large parts of the Oberstadt (upper town) and the ducal palace; it was not until 1514 that reconstruction was completed. Schongau was involved several times in martial conflicts and was often a transit camp of friendly and hostile troops.

Through trade and the diligence of its citizens, Schongau experienced a period of prosperity until the time of the discovery of America, which resulted in relocation of the great trade routes. As a result, the city became so poor that significant buildings such as the castle and the balehouse were partially decayed or demolished. After the Second World War, the city and the surrounding area gained a considerable number of residents due to refugees and developed into a district with relatively low unemployment due to the prosperous middle class.

The city had the first railroad connection with the railway line Landsberg am Lech to Schongau on 16 November 1886. The railway connection in the direction of Weilheim was opened on January 12, 1917, by the section from Peissenberg to Schongau on the railway line Weilheim-Schongau. The railway line Kaufbeuren-Schongau existed from 1923 to 1977, it was built because of mining in Peiting.

Schongau used to be a county of the same name. Due to the Bavarian district reform in 1972, it merged with the Weilheim district into today's Weilheim-Schongau county. In the town are still some institutions from the county authority, and the name Altlandkreis Schongau (lit.: old county Schongau) is still occasionally used.

Transport
The town has a railway station, on the Schongau–Peißenberg line.

Popular culture 
Schongau and the nearby area is the setting of the Oliver Pötzsch novel The Hangman's Daughter.

Twin towns 
  Colmar (France) since 1962
  Lucca (Italy) since 1962
  Sint-Niklaas (Belgium) since 1962
  Abingdon, Oxfordshire since 1970
  Gogolin (Poland) since 1996

Mayor
Since May 1, 2014, the mayor of Schongau is Falk Sluyterman van Langeweyde (SPD). He was elected in March 2014 with 50,3% of the votes.

His predecessor was Karl-Heinz Gerbl (SPD); he was in office from 2008 to 2014.

Sons and daughters of the town

 Reinhold Bocklet (born 1943), CSU politician
 Michael Kreitl (born 1975), ice hockey player
 Franz Rupp (1901-1992), pianist
 Stefan Schauer (born 1983), ice hockey player

Photo gallery

References 

Weilheim-Schongau